James French Hill (born December 5, 1956) is an American businessman and politician serving as the U.S. representative for Arkansas's 2nd congressional district since 2015. He is a member of the Republican Party.

Early life, education and career

Hill was born in Little Rock, Arkansas. He graduated with a Bachelor of Arts degree in economics from Vanderbilt University. He attended the UCLA Anderson Graduate School of Management, where he earned a certified corporate director designation.

From 1982 to 1984, Hill was an aide to Republican Senator John Tower. He was a staffer on the Senate Banking, Housing and Urban Affairs Committee. Hill was executive secretary to President George H. W. Bush’s Economic Policy Council from 1991 to 1993, and Deputy Assistant Secretary of the Treasury for Corporate Finance from 1989 to 1991. Hill founded and was CEO and chairman of the Board Delta Trust and Banking Corporation in Little Rock until its acquisition by Simmons Bank in 2014.

U.S. House of Representatives

Elections

2014

Hill ran for the 2nd district U.S. House seat after fellow Republican Tim Griffin decided instead to run for lieutenant governor. Hill defeated Democratic nominee Pat Hays, the mayor of North Little Rock, 52 to 44 percent.

2016

Hill was renominated in the Republican primary over Brock Olree of Searcy (White County) and was reelected with 58% of the vote against the Democratic nominee, former Little Rock School District Board President Dianne Curry, and Libertarian nominee Chris Hayes of North Little Rock.

2018

In 2017, Arkansas's 2nd district was included on the initial list of Republican-held seats targeted by the Democratic Congressional Campaign Committee in 2018. In the November general election, Hill defeated Democratic nominee Clarke Tucker with 52.1% of the vote to Tucker's 45.8%. Libertarian Joe Swafford received 2%.

2020

Hill ran for another term. Sarah Huckabee Sanders endorsed Hill, speaking at a rally in support of him.

In 2020, the Hill campaign warned that Democratic nominee Joyce Elliott was "as dangerous as they come". Hill warned that if elected, Elliott would "be a member of the Democratic conference and she'd be a member of the Congressional Black Caucus and her first vote would be for Speaker Pelosi to be the speaker of the House." In the November general election, Hill defeated Elliott.

2022 

Hill is running for reelection in 2022.

Tenure
Hill has been a member of the U.S. House during the presidencies of Barack Obama, Donald Trump, and Joe Biden. During Trump's presidency, Hill voted in line with the president's position 96.8% of the time. At the start of Biden's presidency, Hill opposed Biden's decision to cancel the Keystone Pipeline. He said he wanted to work with the Biden administration on policy issues including Iran, free trade, and immigration. As of October 2021, Hill had voted in line with Biden's stated position 12.5% of the time.

On May 4, 2017, Hill voted to repeal the Patient Protection and Affordable Care Act (Obamacare) and pass the American Health Care Act. He voted for the Tax Cuts and Jobs Act of 2017.

On April 17, 2020, House Minority Leader Kevin McCarthy appointed Hill to the COVID-19 Congressional Oversight Commission to oversee the implementation of the CARES Act.

Hill praised the Trump administration's handling of the COVID-19 pandemic.

Hill acknowledged Biden's victory in the 2020 U.S. presidential election, voting to certify the results of the Electoral College and declining to participate in attempts to overturn the election results.

In March 2021, Hill voted against the American Rescue Plan Act of 2021.

In 2020 and 2021, Hill strongly opposed plans by the United States and other nations in the G7 to issue a $650 billion Special Drawing Rights general allocation, calling for a specific and targeted allocation instead.

Hill strongly supported Biden's airstrikes on Iranian targets in Syria.

On May 19, 2021, Hill was one of 35 Republicans who joined all Democrats in voting to approve legislation to establish the January 6, 2021 commission meant to investigate the storming of the U.S. Capitol.

Committee assignments
Committee on Financial Services
Subcommittee on Investor Protection, Entrepreneurship and Capital Markets
Subcommittee on National Security, International Development and Monetary Policy (Ranking Member)

Caucus memberships
 Congressional Arts Caucus
 Republican Study Committee
 United States Congressional International Conservation Caucus
U.S.-Japan Caucus

Political positions

Abortion

Hill describes himself as pro-life. He voted in support of the Pain-Capable Unborn Child Protection Act. He has a 100% rating from the National Right to Life Committee for his pro-life voting record. He supported the 2022 overturning of Roe v. Wade, saying that it "elevates life by affirming that there is no constitutional right to an abortion."

Big Tech
In 2022, Hill was one of 39 Republicans to vote for the Merger Filing Fee Modernization Act of 2022, an antitrust package that would crack down on corporations for anti-competitive behavior.

Electoral history

Personal life

A ninth-generation Arkansan and a Roman Catholic, Hill resides in Little Rock. He and his wife, Martha McKenzie, have two children.

References

External links

 Representative French Hill official U.S. House website
 French Hill for Congress
 
 
 

|-

1956 births
Living people
21st-century American politicians
American bankers
American Roman Catholics
Catholics from Arkansas
Politicians from Little Rock, Arkansas
Republican Party members of the United States House of Representatives from Arkansas
UCLA Anderson School of Management alumni
United States Department of the Treasury officials
Vanderbilt University alumni